Taxi nach Kairo is a 1987 film written and directed by Frank Ripploh and the sequel to Taxi zum Klo. The film is about a love triangle between Frank, Klara, an actress posing as Frank's wife in order to appease his mother, and their neighbor, Eugen. The title translates to Taxi to Cairo.

Cast
Frank Ripploh as Frank Ripploh
Christine Neubauer as Klara
Udo Schenk as Eugen
Bernd Broaderup as Bernd Broaderup
Nina Schuehl
Domenica Niehoff
Burkhard Driest

References

External links

1987 films
1987 LGBT-related films
German LGBT-related films
West German films
1980s German-language films
1980s German films